Harvey Skinner (born 31 December 1997) is an English rugby union player who plays for Exeter Chiefs in the Premiership Rugby. His playing position is fly-half.

References

External links
Exeter Chiefs Profile
ESPN Profile
Ultimate Rugby Profile

1997 births
Living people
English rugby union players
Exeter Chiefs players
Rugby union players from Taunton
Rugby union fly-halves